Municipal elections were held in all 21 municipalities in Montenegro between June 2000 and October 2002.

It resulted in the victory of the opposition subjects in most of the municipalities, while the ruling DPS remained in power in only six out of 21 municipalities.

Results

Podgorica

Herceg Novi

Results in rest of municipalities
After the elections the ruling DPS-SDP coalition remained in power in Bar, Bijelo Polje, Danilovgrad, Plav and Rožaje municipalities. The major opposition coalition Together for Change (SNP-SNS-NS) formed majority in Mojkovac, Berane, Žabljak, Plužine, Šavnik, Pljevlja, Andrijevica and Kolašin, while in Nikšić, Tivat, Kotor, Cetinje and Budva they formed a post-election coalition with Liberal Alliance of Montenegro to form municipal governments.

References

2000-02
Montenegro
2000 in Montenegro
Elections in Serbia and Montenegro